Auchmillan is a village in East Ayrshire, Scotland.

Villages in East Ayrshire